The 1590s BC was a decade lasting from January 1, 1599 BC to December 31, 1590 BC.

Events and trends
 ca. 1595 BC—Mursili I, king of the Hittites, sacks Babylon. This brings an end to the rule of the descendants of Hammurabi in that kingdom.

Significant people
 1597 BC—Aaron born to Amram and his wife Jochebed (traditional date)

References